Raymond & Tirza Martin High School, known as Martin High School, is a secondary school in the Laredo Independent School District in Laredo, Texas, United States. Grades 9–12 are taught there. It serves students living in central Laredo. The school is adjacent to the Laredo Civic Center.

History

Laredo High School, the first public school in Laredo, was founded downtown in 1916 at the site of the present day La Posada Hotel. In 1937, Laredo High School was moved to San Bernardo Avenue and renamed Martin High School. It was the only public high school in Laredo from 1937 until 1964, when J. W. Nixon High School opened in The Heights neighborhood.

Magnet school

The Dr. Dennis D. Cantu Health and Science Magnet School focuses on health and science education, with two career paths available. Dennis Cantu is a graduate, not of Martin High School but of J. W. Nixon High School, a practicing physician in Laredo, and a member of the Laredo independent school Board.

Notable alumni
Esther Buckley (1948–2013), Class of 1963 – educator and politician.
Arturo Campos (1943–2001), NASA engineer
 Ramón H. Dovalina (born 1943), Class of 1960 – president of Laredo Community College, 1995 to 2007
 Abraham Kazen (1919–1987) – U.S. representative from 1967 to 1983
 Juan L. Maldonado (born 1948), Class of 1967 – President of Laredo Community College since 2007
 J. C. "Pepe" Martin, Jr. (1913–1998), Class of 1930 – Mayor of Laredo, 1954 to 1978
 César A. Martínez (born 1944), artist, prominent in the Chicano world of art
 Alicia Dickerson Montemayor (1902–1989), Class of 1924 – Hispanic activist and community organizer

References

External links
 

High schools in Laredo, Texas
Laredo Independent School District high schools
Magnet schools in Texas